The Wilkinson Baronetcy, of Brook in Witley in the County of Surrey, is a title in the Baronetage of the United Kingdom. It was created on 8 December 1941 for George Wilkinson, Lord Mayor of London from 1940 to 1941.

Wilkinson baronets, of Brook (1941)
Sir George Henry Wilkinson, 1st Baronet (1885–1967)
Sir (Leonard) David Wilkinson, 2nd Baronet (1920–1972)
Sir (David) Graham Brook Wilkinson, 3rd Baronet (born 1947)

There is no heir to the baronetcy.

Arms

Notes

References
Kidd, Charles, Williamson, David (editors). Debrett's Peerage and Baronetage (1990 edition). New York: St Martin's Press, 1990,

External links
Portrait of Sir George Wilkinson, 1st Baronet, at the National Portrait Gallery

Wilkinson